Sharpe's Company is a British television drama, the third of a series that follows the career of Richard Sharpe, a British soldier during the Napoleonic Wars. This episode is based on the 1982 novel of the same name by Bernard Cornwell.

Plot

It is 1812. General Wellesley is ready to invade Spain from Portugal but two formidable fortresses stand in the way. Ciudad Rodrigo is taken, but Colonel Lawford is severely wounded and forced to relinquish command of the South Essex Regiment, depriving Captain Sharpe of an influential friend.

Colonel Windham, the new commander, brings his own officers, so Sharpe is demoted to lieutenant and is humiliated by being put in charge of the baggage and losing command of his "chosen men" to an aristocratic officer who purchased the commission of the South Essex's Light Company. Worse, one of the reinforcements is Sergeant Obidiah Hakeswill, an old enemy from Sharpe's days in India.

Meanwhile, Sharpe's lover, Teresa, tells him that he has a baby daughter living with her family in Badajoz, the second fortress town. Not knowing who she is, Hakeswill tries to rape her, but proves no match for her. Teresa then slips into Badajoz to spy on the French and to see her baby.

To cause trouble for Sharpe, Hakeswill steals from the officers and plants a picture frame belonging to Windham in the kit of Sharpe's right-hand man, Sergeant Harper. When it is found, the colonel has Harper flogged. Later, during a night skirmish, a turncoat French soldier escapes the besieged town, bearing a dispatch and a letter from Teresa, but he is shot and killed. Sharpe recovers the letter, which contains a map showing where she is staying, but on his way back Hakeswill tries to shoot Sharpe in the confusion, but kills a young ensign.

Eventually the walls of Badajoz are breached, but the first assault falters. Sharpe rallies the men and leads them into the town. Hakeswill gets to Teresa first due to the letter he stole from Sharpe. Harry Price, one of Sharpe's officers, intervenes and is shot and apparently killed by Hakeswill while trying to protect Teresa. (Price reappears, in Sharpe's Waterloo, this time played by Nicholas Irons.) Sharpe is not far behind and stops Hakeswill, who is wounded in the process, but Hakeswill still manages to get away. Hakeswill then rapes and murders the widow of one of the company's soldiers, before retrieving his cache of stolen goods and deserting.

For his bravery and because many of the other officers have been killed, Sharpe gets back command of his Light Company. Harper is exonerated when he finds the missing portrait of Windham's wife hidden in Hakeswill's shako and returns it to the colonel.

Cast
 Sean Bean as Richard Sharpe
 Daragh O'Malley as Sergeant Patrick Harper
 Assumpta Serna as Comandante Teresa Moreno
 Clive Francis as Colonel Windham 
 Nicholas Jones as Colonel Fletcher 
 Michael Byrne as Major Nairn
 Hugh Fraser as Lord Wellington
 Pete Postlethwaite as Sergeant Obadiah Hakeswill
 Michael Mears as Rifleman Francis Cooper
 John Tams as Rifleman Daniel Hagman
 Jason Salkey as Rifleman Harris
 Lyndon Davies as Rifleman Ben Perkins
 William Mannering as  Ensign Matthews (Viscount)
 Scott Cleverdon as Lieutenant Harry Price
 Robert Morgan as Major Collett
 Peter Gunn as Private Clayton
 Louise Germaine as Sally Clayton
 Soo Drouet as Mrs. Grimes
 Marc Warren as Captain Rymer
 Peter Birrel as Don Moreno
 Tat Whalley as Hope
 Jérôme Pradon as Reynier

References

External links
 
 Sharpe's Company at SharpeFilm.com

1994 British television episodes
1990s historical films
1990s war films
Films based on British novels
Films based on historical novels
Films based on military novels
Napoleonic Wars films
Company
War television films
Fiction set in 1812
Films directed by Tom Clegg (director)